Leni Parker (born November 5, 1966) is a Canadian television and film actress. She is best known for her portrayal of the androgynous alien Da'an in Gene Roddenberry's Earth: Final Conflict.

Early life and education
Parker was born and raised in New Brunswick. She moved to Montreal, where she completed a three-year acting program at Concordia University.

Career 
After graduating from Concordia, she began working with Pigeons International Theatre for the next 10 years. She was awarded Best Supporting Actress at the Theatre Critics of Quebec Awards in 1992 for her role as la Bonne in Coquelicots.

Filmography

Film

Television

Video games

References

External links

1966 births
Living people
Canadian film actresses
Canadian television actresses
Concordia University alumni
Actresses from New Brunswick
20th-century Canadian actresses
21st-century Canadian actresses